Beli Manastir is a town in eastern Croatia. It is the principal town of the Croatian part of Baranja, located in the Osijek-Baranja County.

Name
The name means "white monastery" in Serbo-Croatian. Originally called Monoštor, the current name was adopted in 1923. It is also known as Pélmonostor in Hungarian, and Manoster in German.

Other names formerly used for the town were: Pél, Bell, and Monostor. All names are connected with monasteries that existed in history at this location. The first monastery was built in the 9th century during the rule of Slavic duke Kocelj but was later razed, and all that remained of it was pil (obelisk in English), hence the later Hungarian name Pél, which was a version of the Slavic word.

History

In the 9th century, this area was part of the Slavic Principality of Lower Pannonia and a Slavic monastery was situated here. The monastery was founded during the visit of Cyril and Methodius, who spread Christianity among Slavs. After Methodius died, his students were expelled and the monastery was razed.

After the arrival of the Hungarians in the 10th century, this area was included in the newly founded Hungarian state and the settlement was built at this locality. The town was first mentioned in 1212 under name Pél. During Hungarian administration, another monastery was built here (in the 13th century), but it was destroyed by the Mongols in 1241. It was later rebuilt, but was again destroyed during the Ottoman conquest in the 16th century. Between 11th and 16th centuries, the area administratively belonged to the Baranya county.

In the 16th–17th century, the area was part of the Ottoman Empire and administratively belonged to the Sanjak of Mohaç. Since the end of the 17th century, the area was part of the Habsburg monarchy and administratively belonged to the Baranya county, which was part of the Habsburg Kingdom of Hungary.

Until the end of World War II, the Inhabitants was Danube Swabians, also called locally as Stifolder, because there Ancestors once came around 1720 from Fulda (district). Mostly of the former German Settlers was expelled to Allied-occupied Germany and Allied-occupied Austria in 1945-1948, about the Potsdam Agreement.

Since 1918, the town was part of the Kingdom of Serbs, Croats and Slovenes (later renamed to Yugoslavia). From 1918 to 1922, it was part of the Novi Sad county, from 1922 to 1929 part of the Bačka Oblast, and from 1929 to 1941 part of the Danube Banovina. From 1941 to 1944, it was occupied by Hungary and was administratively included into Baranya county. It was returned to Yugoslav control in 1944 and was administratively part of Vojvodina until 1945, when it was transferred to the People's Republic of Croatia.

During the Croatian War of Independence (1991–1995), Beli Manastir was occupied by Serbian paramilitaries and incorporated along with some other towns into the Republic of Serbian Krajina. It was returned to Croatian control after the war, following the short period of UN administration (1996–1998). Beli Manastir is an underdeveloped municipality which is statistically classified as the First Category Area of Special State Concern by the Government of Croatia.

Town of Beli Manastir

Geography

The Town of Beli Manastir is composed of 4 settlements:
Beli Manastir, population 8,049
 Branjin Vrh, population 993
 Šećerana, population 540
 Šumarina, population 486

Demographics

1910
According to the 1910 census, the town had 2,447 inhabitants, of which:
 Germans – 1,496 (61.1%)
 Serbs – 478 (19.5%)
 Hungarians – 443 (18.1%)
 Croats – 6 (0.24%)
 others – 24 (0.98%)

1929
In 1929 the population was made of: 
Hungarians – 33.8%
Germans – 32.6%
Croats – 18.8%
Serbs – 12%

1981
53,409 total

 Croats – 19,136 (35.83%)
 Serbs – 12,857 (24.07%)
 Hungarians – 9,920 (18.57%)
 Yugoslavs – 8,850 (16.57%)
 Slovenes – 353 (0.66%)
 Montenegrins – 276 (0.52%)
 Romani – 262 (0.49%)
 Muslims – 82 (0.15%)
 Albanians – 56 (0.11%)
 Macedonians – 45 (0.08%)

2001
The town had a population of 8,671, while total municipality population was 10,986. Ethnic composition of Beli Manastir municipality by 2001 census was:
Croats = 6,085 (55.39%)
Serbs = 2,920 (26.58%)
Hungarians = 933 (8.49%)
Romani = 153 (1.39%)
Germans = 122 (1.11%)

Buildings and structures
In 1966, a broadcasting mast standing 202 metres high was erected.

Economy
Beli Manastir is home to the STARCO Beli steel wheel factory.

Beli Manastir (settlement)

Parts of settlement (hamlets)

Beli Manastir, Beli Manastir-Planina, Haljevo and Palača. Till 1991. part of settlement was also Sudaraž which is now independent settlement.

Population

Ethnic composition, 1991. census

Austria-Hungary 1910. census

 In 1910. census together with settlement Sudaraž.

See also

 Osijek-Baranja County
 Baranya
 Baranya County (former)

References

Literature
 Book: "Narodnosni i vjerski sastav stanovništva Hrvatske, 1880–1991: po naseljima, autor: Jakov Gelo, izdavač: Državni zavod za statistiku Republike Hrvatske, 1998., ;

External links

Croatia struggles for post-war harmony
Theater of Beli Manastir

Cities and towns in Croatia
Baranya (region)
Municipalities of Osijek-Baranja County
1212 establishments in Europe
13th-century establishments in Croatia